Zilch means "nothing" or "zero". Zilch may also refer to:

 Zilch (software), a compiler used by Infocom to create Z-machine games
 Zilch (electromagnetism), a group of conserved quantities of the electromagnetic field
 Zilch (game), an alternative name for the dice game Dice 10000
 Zilch: The Power of Zero in Business, a book by Nancy Lublin

In music 
 Zilch (band), a Japanese American rock band
 Sonicflood, an American Christian band formerly known as Zilch
 "Zilch" (song), a song from the 1967 Monkees album Headquarters
 Zilch, the working name for the 2011 KMFDM album WTF?!
 Zilch (album)